The Al Maktoum Challenge, Round 2, is a horse race run over a distance of 1,900 metres (1 mile, one and a half furlongs) on dirt in February at Meydan Racecourse in Dubai. It is the second of three races in the Al Maktoum Challenge series which serve as trial races for the Dubai World Cup.

It was first run in 1994 on dirt at Nad Al Sheba Racecourse. It was transferred to Meydan in 2010 where it was run on the synthetic Tapeta Footings surface. In 2015 the synthetic surface at Meydan was replaced by a dirt track.

The race was originally run over 2,000 metres and was run over 2,400 metres in 1996 before the distance was reduced to 1,800 metres in 1997. The current distance was established when the race moved to Meydan in 2010.

The race began as an ungraded stakes race before attaining Listed status in 1996. The race was elevated to Group 3 level in 2002 and became a Group 2 event in 2012.

Records
Record time:
1:46.92 - Altibr (1999) (1800 metres)
1:55.67 - Prince Bishop (2014) (1900 metres)

Most successful horse (2 wins):
 Best of the Bests – 2001, 2002
 Jack Sullivan – 2005, 2006

Most wins by a jockey:
 5 - Frankie Dettori (1996, 2001, 2002, 2003, 2009)

Most wins by a trainer:
 12 - Saeed bin Suroor (1996, 1999, 2001, 2002, 2003, 2009, 2010, 2012, 2013, 2014, 2018, 2020)

Most wins by an owner:
 10 - Godolphin Racing (1995, 2001, 2002, 2003, 2009, 2010, 2013, 2016, 2018, 2020)

Winners 

 Worldly Manner finished first in 2000 but was disqualified after failing a post-race drug test.

See also
 List of United Arab Emirates horse races

References

Racing Post:

Horse races in the United Arab Emirates
Recurring sporting events established in 1994
Nad Al Sheba Racecourse
1994 establishments in the United Arab Emirates